Hugo Ericson (10 March 1886 – 2 February 1945) was a Swedish athlete. He competed in the men's pentathlon at the 1912 Summer Olympics.

References

External links
 

1886 births
1945 deaths
Athletes (track and field) at the 1912 Summer Olympics
Swedish pentathletes
Olympic athletes of Sweden
People from Sundsvall
Sportspeople from Västernorrland County